The Haunted Air is the sixth volume in a series of Repairman Jack books written by American author F. Paul Wilson. The book was first published by Gauntlet Press in a signed limited first edition (June 2002) then later as a trade hardcover from Forge (October 2002) and a mass market paperback from Forge (April 2004).

2002 American novels
Repairman Jack (series)